William P. Roberts (July 11, 1841 – March 28, 1910) was an American politician and diplomat. He was also a senior officer of the Confederate States Army who commanded cavalry in the Eastern Theater of the American Civil War. Promoted to Brigadier-General at the age of 23, he was the youngest Confederate general.

Early life 
William Paul Roberts was born July 11, 1841 in Gates County, North Carolina, the son of John S. and Jane Roberts.

American Civil War 
In 1861, at the age of 19, Roberts enlisted as a private in Company C of the 19th Regiment North Carolina Infantry, which would later be designated as the 2nd Regiment NC Cavalry. Having served with distinction during regimental operations in North Carolina, but with no formal military training, he was promoted to second lieutenant on August 30, 1861. On September 13, 1862, Roberts was promoted to First Lieutenant. Roberts' regiment was transferred to Virginia in the fall of the same year and took part in several battles, among them: Battle of Fredericksburg, Battle of Suffolk, and Battle of Brandy Station. On November 13, 1863, Roberts was promoted to captain and then major before the spring of 1864, when he fought in the North Carolina brigade of William Henry Fitzhugh Lee's division. He was promoted to colonel in June 1864 and during the Siege of Petersburg, he was given command of the 2nd Regiment NC Cavalry. Roberts led a charge against Union breastworks, dismounted, overtook the rifle pits and captured several Union soldiers at the Second Battle of Ream's Station on August 25, 1864. On February 23, 1865, Roberts was promoted to brigadier general. According to tradition, General Robert E. Lee presented Roberts with Lee's personal gauntlets in recognition of Roberts' distinguished service. Roberts continued the command of his brigade at the Battle of Five Forks, and eventually surrendered at the Battle of Appomattox Court House, on April 9, 1865.

Later life 
Following the War, Roberts returned to Gates County, NC, where he married Eliza Ann Roberts. He entered state politics as the representative for Gates County at the Constitutional Convention in 1875. In 1876, Roberts was elected to the North Carolina legislature. He eventually became the Auditor of North Carolina and served in that capacity from 1880 until 1888. In 1889, President Grover Cleveland appointed him United States Consul for Victoria, British Columbia.

Death 
Roberts died in Norfolk, Virginia on March 28, 1910. He is buried in his home county at Gatesville, North Carolina.

See also 
 Galusha Pennypacker, youngest Union Army general
 List of American Civil War generals (Confederate)

Notes

References 
 Eicher, John H., and David J. Eicher, Civil War High Commands. Stanford: Stanford University Press, 2001. .
 Sifakis, Stewart. Who Was Who in the Civil War. New York: Facts On File, 1988. .
 Warner, Ezra J. Generals in Gray: Lives of the Confederate Commanders. Baton Rouge: Louisiana State University Press, 1959. .

External links 
 

1841 births
1910 deaths
19th-century American diplomats
19th-century American politicians
American Civil War prisoners of war
American consuls
Burials in North Carolina
Cavalry commanders
Cleveland administration personnel
Confederate States Army brigadier generals
North Carolina Democrats
People from Gates County, North Carolina
People of North Carolina in the American Civil War
State Auditors of North Carolina